The Bad Influence is the fourth studio album by American rapper Lil Wyte from Memphis, Tennessee. It was released on August 25, 2009, via Hypnotize Minds/Asylum Records. Production was handled by DJ Paul and Juicy J. It features guest appearances from Project Pat, Juicy J and DJ Paul.

The album peaked at #104 on the Billboard 200, at #18 on Top R&B/Hip-Hop Albums, and #5 on the Top Rap Albums.

Track listing

Charts

References 

2009 albums
Lil Wyte albums
Albums produced by DJ Paul
Albums produced by Juicy J